Adelicia Hayes Franklin Acklen Cheatham (March 15, 1817 – May 4, 1887), best known as Adelicia Acklen, became the wealthiest woman in Tennessee and a plantation owner in her own right after the 1846 death of her first husband, Isaac Franklin. As a successful slave trader, he had used his wealth to purchase numerous plantations, lands, and slaves in Tennessee and Louisiana. Acklen later in 1880 sold four contiguous plantations in Louisiana as one property. These have formed the grounds of the Louisiana State Penitentiary (also known as "Angola" after one of the plantations) since 1901.

When married to her second husband, Joseph Alexander Smith Acklen, Adelicia Acklen built the Belmont Mansion in Nashville, Tennessee. She sold the property in 1887; it was converted for use as a college campus. It is now operated as a museum at the center of what is now known as Belmont University.

Early life
Adelicia Hayes was born on March 15, 1817, in Nashville, Tennessee. Her parents were Northerners: her father was Oliver Bliss Hayes (1783–1858), a lawyer and later Presbyterian minister from South Hadley, Massachusetts. He was related to Rutherford B. Hayes (1822–1893), the 19th President of the United States from 1877 to 1881. Her mother was Sarah Clements (Hightower) Hayes (1795–1871). They lived at Rokeby.

Adult life

In 1839, at age 22, Hayes married Isaac Franklin (1789–1846), a 50-year-old slave trader and planter. He started fully concentrating on his plantations by 1841, mostly in Louisiana. The couple had four children together: Victoria (1840–1846), Adelicia (1842–1846), Julius Caesar (1844–1844) and Emma Franklin (1844–1855), none of whom survived childhood.

The widow Franklin became the wealthiest woman in Tennessee.

In 1849, the widow Franklin married a second time, to Joseph Alexander Smith Acklen (1816–1863). Together, they built the Belmont Mansion outside Nashville for use as a summer estate, complete with gardens and a zoo. They had six children; two daughters died young, Laura (1852–1855) and Corinne (1852–1855). The others made careers and families: Joseph H. Acklen (1850–1938) became a politician and served as U.S. Representative from Louisiana; William Hayes Ackland (1855–1940) was an attorney, writer and art collector; Claude M. Acklen (1857–1920), and Pauline (1859–1931) married a Mr. Lockett.

Joseph A. S. Acklen died in 1863. Later, Adelicia Acklen married Dr. William Archer Cheatham (1820–1900), a physician and head of the State Insane Asylum. His father, Richard Cheatham (1799–1845), had served one term as United States Representative from Tennessee. However, she soon grew dissatisfied with this marriage and moved to Washington, D. C., where she lived at 1776 Massachusetts Avenue.

In 1887, Acklen Cheatham sold the Belmont Mansion in Nashville. It was later used as a girls academy and then for Ward–Belmont College (which eventually developed into Belmont University).

Acklen had leased and then sold the plantations in Louisiana in 1880. In 1901, the state bought four of them, including the one known as Angola, which became the nickname of the Louisiana State Penitentiary it developed on these lands.

Death
Acklen died on a shopping trip in New York City on May 4, 1887, at the age of seventy. She was buried at the Mount Olivet Cemetery in Nashville, Tennessee.

References

1817 births
1887 deaths
People from Nashville, Tennessee
American planters
Burials at Mount Olivet Cemetery (Nashville)
Belmont University people
American slave owners
19th-century American landowners
American women landowners
19th-century American businesswomen
19th-century American businesspeople
American women slave owners